José Vitor Geminiano Cavalieri (born 10 June 2002), known as Zé Vitor, is a Brazilian footballer who plays as a defender for Vasco da Gama.

Club career
Born in Colorado, Paraná, Zé Vitor progressed through the academies of PSTC, São Paulo and Paraná. He joined Vasco da Gama in 2020 from Paraná. Only one year later, he renewed his contract with the club. He made his professional debut with the club during the 2022 season.

In January 2023, he again renewed his contract with Vasco da Gama.

Career statistics

Club

References

2002 births
Living people
Sportspeople from Paraná (state)
Brazilian footballers
Association football defenders
Campeonato Brasileiro Série B players
Paraná Soccer Technical Center players
São Paulo FC players
Paraná Clube players
CR Vasco da Gama players